Oleg Garapuchik (born 29 May 1997) is a Belarusian professional footballer.

References

External links 
 
 

1997 births
Living people
Sportspeople from Brest Region
People from Luninets District
Belarusian footballers
Association football midfielders
FC Shakhtyor Soligorsk players
FC Granit Mikashevichi players
FC Baranovichi players
FC Volna Pinsk players
FC UAS Zhitkovichi players
FC Luninets players